FRC may refer to:

Education 
 Feather River College, in California, United States
 FIRST Robotics Competition, an annual international robotics competition for students aged 14-18
 Fort Richmond Collegiate, a high school in Winnipeg, Manitoba, Canada

Government 
 Family Records Centre, a defunct British genealogical library
 Federal Radio Commission, a defunct regulatory agency of the United States federal government
 Federal Republic of China, a proposed federal republic encompassing mainland China, Macau, and Hong Kong
 Financial Reporting Council, an independent regulator in the United Kingdom and Ireland
 Federal Record Centers, maintained by NARA
 First Responders Children's Foundation, an American non-profit organization. See Disney Princess.

Religion 
 Family Research Council, an American conservative Christian organization
 Family Rosary Crusade, a Roman Catholic prayer movement
 Family Rosary Crusade (TV program), a Philippine television program
 Free Reformed Churches (disambiguation)

Technology 
 Fast Response Car, of the Singapore Police Force
 Fast Response Cutter of the United States Coast Guard
 Fiber-reinforced composite
 Fiber-reinforced concrete
 Field-reversed configuration
 Flame-resistant clothing
 Frame rate control

Music
 "F.R.C." (song), a 1991 single by Australian rock band The Screaming Jets

Other uses 
 Cajun French (ISO 639-3 language code)
 Fatah - Revolutionary Council, a terrorist organization
 Federacion de Radioaficionados de Cuba, a Cuban amateur radio organization
 Fibroblastic reticular cells
 Finnish Red Cross
 First Republic Bank, an American bank
 First Round Capital, an American venture capital firm
 First Reserve Corporation, an American private equity firm
 Fischer Random Chess, a chess variant
 Folk Research Centre, in Saint Lucia
 Fourier ring correlation
 Franca Airport, in Brazil
 Frater Rosae Crucis, a title in the Rosicrucian Order
 Fraternitas Rosae Crucis, an American Rosicrucian organization
 French Republican Calendar
 Functional residual capacity
 Functional Road Class
 Futuristic Retro Champions, a Scottish band